German-Indian, Indian-German or Indo-German may refer to:
Indo-German languages, alternative name for the Indo-European languages
As an adjective, anything pertaining to Germany–India relations
Indians in Germany
Germans in India